Carmanah Point Light Station is a lighthouse on the southwest coast of Vancouver Island at the entrance from the Pacific Ocean to the Strait of Juan de Fuca.

History 
The Carmanah Point Light Station was established in 1891. The first light was built of wood and was attached to the keeper's housing.  The present tower was built in 1920 of concrete and remains in operation. The area is said to be named for the upstream Nitinaht village. It is said the name means "thus far upstream".

Keepers 
William Phillip Daykin 1891–1912)
George Woodley 1912
Robert S. Daykin 1912–1917 
James W. Davies 1917–1924 
Thomas A. McNabb 1924–1930, 1944 
John Alfred Hunting 1930–1931 
Henry Seymour Briggs 1931–1934 
Henry I. McKenzie 1935 
G.M. Clark 1935 
William Charles Copeland 1935–1940 
Walter Calverly, 1940–1941 
F.A. Mountain 1941-1946 
Francis George Copeland 1946–1952 
G.D. Wellard 1952-1958 
Bert Pearce 1964–1969 
Arthur Britton 1970–1976 
Robert W. Noble 1976–1979 
Don DeRousic 1979–1983 
Dieter Losel 1983–1986 
Jerry K. Etzkorn 1986–2016
Justine J. Etzkorn 2016-

See also 
 List of lighthouses in British Columbia
Gibbs, Jim, Lighthouses of the Pacific, Philadelphia 1986 Schiffer 
 List of lighthouses in Canada

References

External links

 Aids to Navigation Canadian Coast Guard

Lighthouses completed in 1891
Lighthouses completed in 1920
Lighthouses in British Columbia
1891 establishments in British Columbia
Heritage sites in British Columbia
Lighthouses on the Canadian Register of Historic Places